Alcala, officially the Municipality of Alcala,  is a 3rd class municipality in the province of Cagayan, Philippines. According to the 2020 census, it has a population of 41,295 people.

Alcala is home to the Saint Philomene Church, regarded as the widest church in the Cagayan Valley.

Alcala is the birthplace of Senator Melecio Arranz of 1st Senatorial District of the Philippines.

History
The indigenous tribes of the Ibanag people were the first settlers of modern-day Alcala. They called the area Fulay, literally meaning red, in its reference to the distinct red color of its soil. After two centuries of Spanish rule, it fell under its jurisdiction on 20 July 1789 when it was proclaimed as a township. However, it was not until 1843 when it was renamed Alcala, in honour of the captain general Don Francisco Paulo de Alcala.

Geography

Barangays
Alcala is politically subdivided into 25 barangays. These barangays are headed by elected officials: Barangay Captain, Barangay Council, whose members are called Barangay Councilors. All are elected every three years.

Climate

Demographics

Economy 

Alcala Milk Candy is a famous product of this municipality.

Government
Alcala, belonging to the first legislative district of the province of Cagayan, is governed by a mayor designated as its local chief executive and by a municipal council as its legislative body in accordance with the Local Government Code. The mayor, vice mayor, and the councilors are elected directly by the people through an election which is being held every three years.

Elected officials

Education
The Schools Division of Cagayan governs the town's public education system. The division office is a field office of the DepEd in Cagayan Valley region. The office governs the public and private elementary and public and private high schools throughout the municipality.

References

External links
[ Philippine Standard Geographic Code]
Philippine Census Information

Municipalities of Cagayan
Populated places on the Rio Grande de Cagayan